2006 Dutch Open may refer to:

 2006 Dutch Open (badminton)
 2006 Dutch Open (tennis)